Jack Finsterer (born 1968) is an Australian film and TV actor. He has been acting since the age of 25 and has appeared in some of Australia's best-known TV shows. He is also a film actor who has participated in 43 Television Series and Films from 1993 to 2022.

Finsterer has appeared in several Television and films, including “Janus” (1994~1995), “Blue Heelers” (1996), “Tulip” (1998), “Kokoda“ (2006) and “Dangerous” (2007) . He has also done voice-over work in Short Film “The Hunter” (2011)

He is best known as a leading actor in the Australian historical film “Kokoda“ (2006)

Background
Jack (John) Finsterer was born in Australia in 1968.

Finsterer grew up in Dickson, Canberra, where he attended Daramalan College, before going on to study drama at the Victorian College of Arts in Melbourne.

Film and Television 
Finsterer's debut was on film "Gross misconduct" in 1993 and his role was a policeman.

Finsterer's first significant acting role was as the character Bobby Webster in the 1994 television series "Law of the Land".  The same year He appeared in the TV series "Janus"  and featured in the 1996 television series "Blue Heelers" The following year He made appearances in film "Zone39".

Filmography
Television

Film

Personal life
In 1999 Finsterer married Justine Clarke who is known as an Australian actress, singer, musician, and television host.

Finsterer and his wife have three children – Josef (2001), Nina (2003), and Max (2009).

He and his family live in Sydney.

Away from acting, Finsterer has worked in a Melbourne wine shop, started a business selling beauty products, and worked in corporate hospitality at the Sydney Cricket Ground.

References

External links

Australian male television actors
Australian male film actors
Living people
1968 births
University of Melbourne alumni
People from the Australian Capital Territory